Michael Walter Blaisdell (born January 18, 1960) is a Canadian former professional ice hockey right winger who played in the National Hockey League (NHL) between 1980 and 1989 and later in the British Hockey League (BHL) from 1990 to 2001. He was selected 11th overall in the 1980 NHL Entry Draft by the Detroit Red Wings. Blaisdell later worked as a coach in the United Kingdom.

Professional career

Amateur and college hockey
Blaisdell was born in Moose Jaw, Saskatchewan and raised in Regina, Saskatchewan. In 1978, Blaisdell joined the Regina Pats of the WCHL (later the WHL for the end of the 1977-78 regular season and the playoffs. In the final six games of the season, Blaisdell scored 5 goals and 5 assists, for 10 points and a 1.66 points per game average. He added 11 points in 13 playoff games. The following season, Blaisdell played 20 games at University of Wisconsin–Madison before returning to the Pats for the 1979–80 WHL season.

NHL career
In the 1980 NHL Entry Draft the Detroit Red Wings took Blaisdell with their 11th overall pick. They placed him in their farm team the Adirondack Red Wings of the American Hockey League (AHL) and instantly saw his potential. After just 41 games, Blaisdell was called up to play for Detroit. In the 1981–82 season, Blaisdell formed a solid unit with Mark Kirton and Paul Woods. He scored 23 goals and ended with 55 points that season but the Red Wings failed to reach the playoffs. He continued to chip in goals for the Red Wings and on June 13, 1983 was involved in a large trade to the New York Rangers with Willie Huber and Mark Osborne for Ron Duguay, Eddie Mio and Eddie Johnstone.

Most of Blaisdell's time with the Rangers was spent in and out of their farm teams; the Tulsa Oilers of the Central Hockey League (CHL) and the New Haven Nighthawks of the AHL. He won the 1983-84 CHL Championship (Adams Cup) as a member of the Tulsa Oilers team coached by Tom Webster. Due to bankruptcy, the Oilers suspended operations on February 16, 1984, and the team played only road games for final six weeks of 1983-84 season. Despite this adversity, the team went on to win the league's championship. Blaisdell played in all nine playoff games, and lead the team in both goals (6 - tied with Bob Scurfield) and points (12 - tied with Gary Burns).

After failing to find a role in the organization, he was claimed off waivers by the Pittsburgh Penguins on October 7, 1985. He scored 15 goals and played some of his best two-way hockey during the 1985–86 season, but his playing time decreased the next year while splitting time with Pittsburgh's farm team, the Baltimore Skipjacks. After that season, Blaisdell was signed as a free agent by the Toronto Maple Leafs on July 10, 1987 but only played in 27 games for the Leafs for the following two years, which would be his last in the National Hockey League.

International play
Blaisdell played with the Canadian National Team during the 1990–91 season. Partway through, he changed his mind and decided to look for other opportunities. He joined the roster of Schwenninger ERC in West Germany's Eishockey-Bundesliga for three games and then the Albany Choppers of the International Hockey League (IHL) before heading back to Europe, joining the Durham Wasps of the British Hockey League where he instantly became a fan favourite. He went on to score a record-breaking 74 goals in 1991–92 leading the Wasps to the second of their back-to-back championships. Blaisdell added 41 points the following season before coaching with the Nottingham Panthers. After coaching for half the year, Blaisdell felt he still offered more when he was on the ice. In the 1995–96 season, Blaisdell scored 35 goals to finish with 81 points on the season. Blaisdell slowly drew away from the league (by then called the Ice Hockey Superleague), but would continue to play in a few games until 2001 when he played his last four games for the Sheffield Steelers before retiring.

Coach Blaisdell
Blaisdell again returned to coaching in the 2001–02 season with the team he last stepped on the ice for, the Sheffield Steelers, and finished the 2003–04 season with a record of 44–8–3 and a 0.821 win percentage. He led the Steelers to the league's best record and won the League Championship before retiring from hockey.

Personal life
Blaisdell's son Harrison played junior hockey for the Chilliwack Chiefs in the British Columbia Hockey League and later attended the University of North Dakota.

Career statistics

Regular season and playoffs

Coaching

Awards 
 WHL Second All-Star Team – 1980
 AHL Calder Cup in 1981 (Adirondack Red Wings)
 CHL Championship Adams Cup in 1984 (Tulsa Oilers)
 Great Britain Championship: 1991, 1992 (Durham) 2001 (Sheffield) (as head coach), 2002 (Sheffield) (as head coach)
 Ice Hockey Journalists UK Coach of the Year in 1994–95, 2000–01, 2002–03 and 2003–04
 Inducted to the British Ice Hockey Hall of Fame in 2004
 Inducted to the Sheffield Steelers Hall of Fame in 2006

References

External links 
 
 British Hockey Hall of Fame entry

1960 births
Living people
Adirondack Red Wings players
Albany Choppers players
Baltimore Skipjacks players
British Ice Hockey Hall of Fame inductees
Canadian ice hockey right wingers
Detroit Red Wings draft picks
Detroit Red Wings players
Durham Wasps players
Canadian expatriate ice hockey players in West Germany
Ice hockey people from Saskatchewan
National Hockey League first-round draft picks
New Haven Nighthawks players
New York Rangers players
Newmarket Saints players
Nottingham Panthers coaches
Nottingham Panthers players
Pittsburgh Penguins players
Regina Blues players
Regina Pats players
Schwenninger Wild Wings players
Sheffield Steelers players
HC Sierre players
Sportspeople from Moose Jaw
Sportspeople from Regina, Saskatchewan
Toronto Maple Leafs players
Tulsa Oilers (1964–1984) players
Wisconsin Badgers men's ice hockey players
Canadian expatriate ice hockey players in England
Canadian expatriate ice hockey players in Germany
Canadian expatriate ice hockey players in the United States
Canadian expatriate ice hockey players in Switzerland
Canadian expatriate sportspeople in England